The 1993–94 Bundesliga was the 31st season of the Bundesliga, Germany's premier football league. It began on 6 August 1993 and ended on 7 May 1994. SV Werder Bremen were the defending champions.

Teams 
VfL Bochum, Bayer 05 Uerdingen and 1. FC Saarbrücken were relegated to the 2. Bundesliga after finishing in the last three places. They were replaced by SC Freiburg, MSV Duisburg and VfB Leipzig.

League table

Results

Top goalscorers
18 goals
  Stefan Kuntz (1. FC Kaiserslautern)
  Anthony Yeboah (Eintracht Frankfurt)

17 goals
  Stéphane Chapuisat (Borussia Dortmund)
  Paulo Sérgio (Bayer Leverkusen)
  Toni Polster (1. FC Köln)

14 goals
  Thomas von Heesen (Hamburger SV)

13 goals
  Karsten Bäron (Hamburger SV)
  Ulf Kirsten (Bayer Leverkusen)
  Peter Közle (MSV Duisburg)
  Marek Leśniak (SG Wattenscheid 09)
  Souleyman Sané (SG Wattenscheid 09)
  Fritz Walter (VfB Stuttgart)
  Sergio Zárate (1. FC Nürnberg)

Champion squad

See also
 1993–94 2. Bundesliga
 1993–94 DFB-Pokal

References

External links
 DFB Bundesliga archive 1993/1994

Bundesliga seasons
1
Germany